Nikolay Ivanovich Peyko or Peiko (Николай Иванович Пейко) (25 March 1916 in Moscow – 1 July 1995 in Moscow) was a Russian composer and professor of composition.

Early life
Peyko began his music education at the Academic Music College from 1933 through 1937 where his teachers included Igor Vladimirovich Sposobin (harmony) and Genrik Litinsky (composition). This was followed by three years of training at the Moscow Conservatory where his teachers included  Nikolay Myaskovsky (composition), Nikolai Rakov (orchestration), and Zukkerman (analysis). He graduated in 1940.

Career
Peyko worked in a military hospital during the Second World War and taught at the Moscow Conservatory from 1942 to 1949. After working since 1941–1943 in Ufa at a military hospital, NIkolay partly worked with and was influenced by Dmitri Shostakovich. From 1959 till retirement Peyko was professor of composition at the Gnessin State Musical College where his students included Sofia Gubaidulina, Alexander Arutiunian, and Inna Abramovna Zhvanetskaia. Peyko taught his students twelve-tone technique.

Nikolay's first successful work was From the Legends of Yakuta (1940). During World War II, he worked in a military hospital and composed several patriotic pieces, including Dramatic Overture (1941) and Symphony I (1944-1946). They were appreciated by Myaskovsly and Schostakovich. His classical archives include Moldavian Suite for Orchestra (1950), Tsar Ivan's Night, Jeanne d'Arc, Ballada, for piano, Piano Sonata No.1, Variations for piano, Sonatina for piano No.2, Bylina, for Piano, Piano Sonata No. 2, and Concert Triptych for 2 pianos. Nikolay worked on a genre of "pure" sympathy composed music for theater plays.

Nikolay was more of a traditional composer who absorbed folk music in his musical language. His music is known for a harsh, distant sound. His music has been described as driving march-rhythms with good humor, decorated with the sound of bells. In 1964 he was honored as a Honored Art Worker of the RSFSR. Nikolay began working with 12-note scales in the 1960s. In 2012 he performed in the Irish-Russian chamber-music festival in Moscow.

Recognition 
Nikolay won many awards, including two Stalin prizes for his First Symphony (1947) and his Moldavian Suite (1950–51). He is unknown in the west. His first two CD's cover his piano music and were the first time any music by Peyko was recorded on a western label (though several Soviet recordings of his music reappeared in the West, e.g. his setting of Gogol's The Overcoat on Monitor LPs, or more recently a violin & orchestra fantasia in Brilliant Classics Tretiakov Edition (a 2007 CD set of recordings of Tretiakov's performances.))

Selected works
 Piano Ballad (1939)
 From the Legends of Yakutia, symphonic suite (1940, rev. 1957)
 Dramatic Overture (1941)
 Sonatina-Folktale for Piano (1942)
 Aikhylu, opera (1942)
 Symphony No. 1 (1944–45)
 Symphony No. 2 (1946)
 Piano Concerto (1943–47)
 From the Early Russia, symphonic suite (1948)
 Moldavian Suite for orchestra (1949–50)
 Seven Pieces on Themes of the Soviet People (1950)
 Concerto-Fantasy for violin and orchestra No. 1 on Finnish themes (1953)
 Piano Sonata No. 1 (1946–54)
 Jeanne d'Arc, ballet after Schiller (1952–55)
 Symphonic Ballad (1956)
 Symphony No. 3 (1957)
 Sinfonietta (1959)
 Capriccio for chamber orchestra (1960)
 Piano Quintet (1961)
 String Quartet No. 1 (1962)
 Concerto-Fantasy for violin and orchestra No. 2 (1964)
 Symphony No. 4 (1963–65)
 String Quartet No. 2 (1965)
 One Night of Tsar Ivan, oratorio after Tolstoy (1968)
 Symphony No. 5 (1968)
 Suite for violin and orchestra (1968)
 Decimet (1971)
 Symphony No. 6 (1972)
 Concerto-Symphony (1974)
 Piano Sonata No. 2 (1975)
 String Quartet No. 3 (1976)
 Symphony No. 7 (1977)
 Elegiac Poem for strings (1980)
 One Night of Tsar Ivan, opera based in the 1968 oratorio (1982)
 Concert Variations for two pianos (1983)
 Symphony No. 8 (1985)

Selected recordings
 Complete Piano Music. Toccata Classics (TOCC 0104 and 0105)
 Symphonies 4, 5 & 7. Melodiya LPs (1978, 1981).
 String Quartets. Shostakovich Quartet (Квартет имени Шостаковича) Melodiya LP 33 С 10—13037-8 (1979)

References

External links
 http://www.oxfordmusiconline.com/subscriber/article/grove/music/21520?q=nikolay+peyko&search=quick&pos=1&_start=1#firsthit
 http://memim.com/nikolay-peyko.html
 https://toccataclassics.com/?s=Peyko
 http://www.myaskovsky.ru/?id=46

1916 births
1995 deaths
20th-century composers
20th-century Russian male musicians
Russian composers
Russian male composers
Moscow Conservatory alumni
Pupils of Nikolai Myaskovsky